St Croix Aircraft, was an American manufacturer of wooden propellers for homebuilt and ultralight aircraft and a supplier of aircraft plans and kits. The company headquarters was located in Corning, Iowa.

St Croix is probably best known for its Excelsior ultralight aircraft design.

Aircraft
Aerial
AirCamper
Excelsior
Sopwith Triplane

See also
List of aircraft propeller manufacturers

References 

Aircraft propeller manufacturers
Aerospace companies of the United States